Achterdijk may refer to several places in the Netherlands:
 Achterdijk, North Brabant
 Achterdijk, Utrecht